John Owen (August 1787October 9, 1841) was the 24th Governor of the U.S. state of North Carolina and the state's first Democratic governor from 1828 to 1830.

Biography
Owen was born in Bladen County, North Carolina; he was the son of Thomas Owen, a judge and member of the state legislature. He briefly attended the University of North Carolina at Chapel Hill, but did not earn a degree.

In 1812, Owen was elected to the North Carolina House of Commons and served there for two years; he was later elected to one year in the North Carolina Senate (1819–1820). Named to the North Carolina Council of State in 1824, Owen returned to the state senate in 1827 but was elected Governor by the General Assembly in December 1828, narrowly defeating Richard Dobbs Spaight, Jr. in a vote of 96 to 92.

Owen served two consecutive one-year terms as governor, during which he promoted education and served concurrently as President of the University of North Carolina Board of Trustees. He was nominated for a third term as governor, but declined the nomination; that same year, he lost by one vote (to Willie Mangum) a bid to represent North Carolina in the United States Senate.

In 1835, Owen was a prominent member of the North Carolina Constitutional Convention; there, he supported enfranchisement of land-owning Negro citizens and opposed religious tests for officeholders.

Although during his earlier political life, Owen affiliated himself with the Democratic Party of Andrew Jackson, in 1839, he presided over the first state convention of the emerging Whig Party; three weeks later, he served as president of the National Whig Convention in Harrisburg, Pennsylvania. Owen was offered the vice-presidential position on the Whig presidential ticket of William Henry Harrison; he turned down the nomination. Had he accepted, Owen might have become President of the United States following Harrison's death early in office instead of John Tyler.

Owen retired to his farm in Chatham County, North Carolina, where he died on October 9, 1841 (Raleigh Register and North-Carolina Gazette, Raleigh, NC, October 19, 1841, page 3, column 5); he is buried in the churchyard of St. Bartholomew's Episcopal Church in Pittsboro, North Carolina.

Sources
 

1787 births
1841 deaths
American people of Welsh descent
Governors of North Carolina
People from Bladen County, North Carolina
North Carolina Democrats
North Carolina state senators
Democratic Party governors of North Carolina
North Carolina Whigs
19th-century American politicians